The First Inauguration of Vladimir Putin as the President of Russia took place on Sunday, May 7, 2000. The ceremony was held for the first time in the Grand Kremlin Palace and lasted exactly one hour.

Despite the fact that Boris Yeltsin at the time of the ceremony was already a former president (having resigned December 31, 1999), he was formally invited as a guest, but took part in the ceremony as the outgoing president.

Background

Boris Yeltsin resigned as President of Russia in the end of 1999. Prime Minister Vladimir Putin became Acting President of Russia and won the 2000 Russian presidential election with more than fifty percent of the votes. He took office two months after the elections.

Ceremony

Originally the ceremony was scheduled to take place at the State Kremlin Palace, but Putin requested it to be moved to the Grand Kremlin Palace.

At the beginning of the ceremony, after passing through St. George and Alexander Halls, the soldiers of the Kremlin Regiment brought in Andrew's hall Flag of Russia, Flag of the President of Russia, a special copy of the Russian Constitution and the Sign of the President of Russia.

Then, on the podium in the St. Andrew Hall rose Chairman of the Constitutional Court of Russia Marat Baglay, Chairman of the Federation Council Yegor Stroyev, Chairman of the State Duma Gennady Seleznyov and Chairman of the Central Election Commission of the Russian Federation Alexander Veshnyakov.

Vladimir Putin arrived in the Kremlin and entered the Grand Kremlin Palace.

At St. Andrew's Hall was invited to the First President of Russia Boris Yeltsin.

With the first blow of the Kremlin chimes came Vladimir Putin, passing St. George and Alexander Halls, on the podium in the hall of St. Andrew.

The first speech was made by Chairman of the Central Election Commission of Russia Alexander Veshnyakov. He congratulated Putin on his victory in the elections and said that the elections were held in accordance with the laws of Russia.

The second speech was President of the Constitutional Court Marat Baglai. He called on Vladimir Putin to take the oath of the President of Russia.

After Vladimir Putin said the text of the oath, sounded Anthem of Russia and a copy of the Standard of the President of Russia was raised over the dome of the Kremlin Senate.

After the national anthem, Boris Yeltsin made a speech in which Putin congratulated, wished success and encouraged to continue to build a new democratic Russia.

After Yeltsin, with his first speech as President of Russia, Vladimir Putin speaks.

Vladimir Putin, left St. Andrew's Hall on the accompaniment of the song "Glory" to the music of Mikhail Glinka and Artillery salute.

Then, at the Cathedral Square of the Moscow Kremlin, Boris Yeltsin introduced the Kremlin Regiment of Vladimir Putin, passing thus the authority of the Supreme Commander of the new President.

At the end of the ceremony, Boris Yeltsin and Vladimir Putin accepted congratulations.

Inaugural address

Vladimir Putin's speech:

References

2000 in Moscow
May 2000 events in Russia
Putin 1
Events in Moscow
Ceremonies in Russia
Vladimir Putin
Articles containing video clips